Iridotaenia is a genus of beetles in the family Buprestidae, containing the following species:

 Iridotaenia acutipennis Fisher, 1930
 Iridotaenia aeneipennis Bourgoin, 1925
 Iridotaenia andamana Kerremans, 1893
 Iridotaenia auripennis Kerremans, 1898
 Iridotaenia aurolimbata Deyrolle, 1864
 Iridotaenia auromaculata Théry, 1908
 Iridotaenia bathelieri Théry, 1926
 Iridotaenia baumi Obenberger, 1937
 Iridotaenia bilyi Neef de Sainval, 2002
 Iridotaenia birmanica Obenberger, 1923
 Iridotaenia blanchardii (Gory, 1840)
 Iridotaenia callosicollis Deyrolle, 1864
 Iridotaenia camerunica Théry, 1930
 Iridotaenia celebesica Holynski, 2001
 Iridotaenia chasteli Neef de Sainval, 2002
 Iridotaenia chrysifrons Deyrolle, 1864
 Iridotaenia chrysogramma Deyrolle, 1864
 Iridotaenia chrysolimbata Deyrolle, 1864
 Iridotaenia chrysostoma Deyrolle, 1864
 Iridotaenia cingulata Kerremans, 1892
 Iridotaenia cuprea Deyrolle, 1864
 Iridotaenia cupreomarginata Saunders, 1874
 Iridotaenia cupreopurpurea Kurosawa, 1979
 Iridotaenia cupreovaria Waterhouse, 1877
 Iridotaenia curta Deyrolle, 1864
 Iridotaenia cyaniceps (Fabricius, 1801)
 Iridotaenia delia Thomson, 1879
 Iridotaenia externa Théry, 1928
 Iridotaenia francoisi Baudon, 1966
 Iridotaenia fulgida Thomson, 1878
 Iridotaenia fulminifera Obenberger, 1923
 Iridotaenia glabra Holynski, 2001
 Iridotaenia gressitti Holynski, 2001
 Iridotaenia hainanensis Kurosawa, 1982
 Iridotaenia igniceps Saunders, 1866
 Iridotaenia ignicollis Obenberger, 1923
 Iridotaenia insularis Fisher, 1930
 Iridotaenia kotoensis Miwa & Chûjô, 1940
 Iridotaenia koyoi Holynski, 2001
 Iridotaenia lacunosa Obenberger, 1928
 Iridotaenia laevipennis Théry, 1926
 Iridotaenia laevis Kerremans, 1919
 Iridotaenia landeri Neef de Sainval, 2002
 Iridotaenia latesulcata Kerremans, 1900
 Iridotaenia limbata (Klug, 1855)
 Iridotaenia lineata Deyrolle, 1864
 Iridotaenia mahena Fairmaire, 1891
 Iridotaenia maindroni Théry, 1923
 Iridotaenia marinduquensis Kurosawa, 1979
 Iridotaenia mirabilis (Gory, 1840)
 Iridotaenia monticola Fisher, 1933
 Iridotaenia niasica Kerremans, 1909
 Iridotaenia nickerli Obenberger, 1928
 Iridotaenia nitidiceps Kerremans, 1909
 Iridotaenia obscura Saunders, 1867
 Iridotaenia ocularis Kerremans, 1895
 Iridotaenia palawana Kerremans, 1895
 Iridotaenia piliplagis Obenberger, 1928
 Iridotaenia plicata Kerremans, 1900
 Iridotaenia primordialis Pongrácz, 1935
 Iridotaenia pseudochrysostoma Obenberger, 1928
 Iridotaenia purpurea (Laporte & Gory, 1835)
 Iridotaenia purpureipennis Waterhouse, 1877
 Iridotaenia quadrisignata (Neef de Sainval, 1998)
 Iridotaenia quadrivittata Holynski, 2001
 Iridotaenia riedeli Lansberge, 1880
 Iridotaenia salomonensis Holynski, 2001
 Iridotaenia sandakana Fisher, 1930
 Iridotaenia sarawakensis Kerremans, 1910
 Iridotaenia scutellaris Kerremans, 1896
 Iridotaenia severa Théry, 1923
 Iridotaenia somereni Théry, 1941
 Iridotaenia soror Kerremans, 1894
 Iridotaenia strandi Obenberger, 1928
 Iridotaenia submirabilis Théry, 1911
 Iridotaenia sulcata (Thunberg, 1789)
 Iridotaenia sulcifera Saunders, 1874
 Iridotaenia sumptuosa (Laporte & Gory, 1835)
 Iridotaenia superba Théry, 1908
 Iridotaenia terabayashii Neef de Sainval, 2002
 Iridotaenia tonkinea Théry, 1923
 Iridotaenia tricolor Holynski, 2001
 Iridotaenia trivittata Saunders, 1874
 Iridotaenia verdoncki Neef de Sainval, 2002
 Iridotaenia veselyi Obenberger, 1924
 Iridotaenia vicina Théry, 1908
 Iridotaenia violacea Kerremans, 1896
 Iridotaenia viridiceps Kerermans, 1900
 Iridotaenia wahnesi Heller, 1902
 Iridotaenia weyersi Kerremans, 1900

References

Buprestidae genera